Speranza colata is a species of geometrid moth in the family Geometridae. It is found in North America.

The MONA or Hodges number for Speranza colata is 6308.

Subspecies
These two subspecies belong to the species Speranza colata:
 Speranza colata colata (Grote, 1881)
 Speranza colata correllata (Hulst, 1896)

References

Further reading

 

Macariini
Articles created by Qbugbot
Moths described in 1881